Metropolis was an ancient town of European Sarmatia on the Borysthenes, near Olbia.

References

Greek colonies on the Black Sea coast
Former cities in Ukraine